Peter Waldo (c. 1140 – c. 1205; also Valdo, Valdes, Waldes;) was the leader of the Waldensians, a Christian spiritual movement of the Middle Ages.

The tradition that his first name was "Peter" can only be traced back to the fourteenth century. This has caused some historians, such as Jana Schulman, to see it as likely a later invention. He is considered a Proto-Protestant.

Relationship with Waldenses 

Peter Waldo is regarded by many historians, including Jana Schulman, as having founded the Waldensians sometime between 1170 and 1177.

There were claims that the Waldensians predated Peter Waldo. In his A History of the Vaudois Church (1859), Antoine Monastier quotes Bernard, Abbott of Foncald, writing at the end of the 12th century, that the Waldensians arose during the papacy of Lucius. Monastier takes him to mean Lucius II, Pope from 1144 to 1145, and concludes that the Waldenses were active before 1145. Bernard also says that the same Pope Lucius condemned them as heretics, but they were condemned by Pope Lucius III in 1184.

Monastier also says that Eberard de Béthune, writing in 1210 (although Monastier says 1160), claimed that the name Vaudois meant "valley dwellers" or those who "dwell in a vale of sorrow and tears", and was in use before Peter Waldo.

A claim persisted until the 19th century that Waldo had not begun any new movement but that he had arisen from a pure Christianity established by the Apostles in the Alps soon after Jesus' ascension, and that Waldo was merely perpetuating this pure faith.

Life and work
Most details of Waldo's life are unknown. Extant sources relate that he was a wealthy clothier and merchant from Lyon and a man of some learning. After establishing himself as a successful merchant, Waldo commissioned monks to create a translated copy of the Bible for him. The clerics from Lyon translated the New Testament into the vernacular "Romance" (Franco-Provençal). This has caused Waldo to be credited with providing to Europe the first translation of the Bible in a 'modern tongue' outside of Latin.

Through reading his Bible and writings of the Church Fathers, Waldo became fascinated with the concepts of purity and perfection. In 1173 in pursuit of purity, he embraced poverty after hearing an itinerant singer perform a song about Saint Alexius. Alexius had given up a large inheritance and a beautiful bride in order to live in poverty like Jesus. Waldo sold all he had, forswore his marriage and home, and put his two young daughters into a convent.

Waldo began traveling around Lombardy begging and preaching about the value of poverty. The region of Lombardy was a hotbed of religious reform movements at the time, many of which would be later deemed heresies by the Catholic Church. These include the Cathars, the Humiliati, the Albigensians, and the Speronists. As Waldo gathered followers and they determined their own doctrines they shared many features with these other reform movements - to the point that it becomes difficult for historians to determine the origins of many of the religious ideas circulating among them. Unlike the leaders of these other groups Waldo had never joined the Catholic Church's priesthood or any of its religious orders.

Other events, besides hearing of Saint Alexius, may have also contributed to Waldo's decision to take up poverty and preaching including a rejection of transubstantiation when it was considered a capital crime to do it, and the sudden and unexpected death of a friend during an evening meal. From this point onward he began living a radical Christian life, giving his property over to his wife, while the remainder of his belongings he distributed as alms to the poor. At about this time, Waldo began to preach and teach publicly, based on his ideas of simplicity and poverty, notably that "No man can serve two masters, God and Mammon."

Inspired by his example Waldo began to attract followers and they grew into a community of believers. By 1170 Waldo had gathered a large number of followers, referred to as the Poor of Lyons, the Poor of Lombardy, or the Poor of God. They evangelized their teaching while traveling as peddlers. Often referred to as the Waldensians (or Waldenses), they were distinct from the Albigensians or Cathari. The Waldensian movement was characterized from the beginning by lay preaching, voluntary poverty, and strict adherence to the Bible.

In January 1179, Waldo and one of his disciples went to Rome, where they were welcomed by Pope Alexander III and the Roman Curia. They had to explain their faith before a panel of three clergymen, including issues which were then debated within the Church, such as the universal priesthood, the gospel in the vulgate or local language, and the issue of voluntary poverty. The results of the meeting were inconclusive. The pope affirmed the Waldensians' vow of poverty, but forbade them to continue preaching due to their status as laypeople. Waldo and his followers revolted against the ban and increased their preaching and missionary efforts. They continued to gather followers and began proclaiming doctrines at odds with Catholicism - such as the right of all worthy members including women to preach the Scriptures without permission from Church authorities. They also began preaching against Purgatory, prayers for the dead, and indulgences. They were excommunicated by the Catholic Church. By the late 1180s, they were being pursued as heretics. This persecution only increased their preaching against the Roman Catholic Church. The Waldensians developed a doctrine that forbids the use of weapons or of oaths, which led them to refuse any participation in Catholic rituals. The Catholic hierarchy accused them of apostasy.

Waldo condemned what he considered as papal excesses and Catholic dogmas, including purgatory and transubstantiation. He said that these dogmas were "the harlot" from the book of Revelation.

Waldo's ideas, but not the movement itself, were condemned at the Third Lateran Council in March of the same year. The leaders of the Waldensian movement were not yet excommunicated.

In 1180, Waldo composed a profession of faith which is still extant.

Driven away from Lyon, Waldo and his followers settled in the high valleys of Piedmont, and in France, in the Luberon, as they continued in their pursuit of Christianity based on the New Testament. Finally, Waldo was excommunicated by Pope Lucius III during the synod held at Verona in 1184. The doctrine of the Poor of Lyons was again condemned by the Fourth Lateran Council in 1215, when they mentioned the group by name for the first time, and declared its principles to be heresy. Fearing suppression from the Church, Waldo's followers fled to the mountainous regions of northern Italy in the Waldensian Evangelical Church.

See also
Waldensians
Waldensian Evangelical Church
John Charles Beckwith
Luserna San Giovanni 
Val Pellice
Waldensian valleys

References

Sources

Primary

Secondary

Further reading

 Audisio, Gabriel, The Waldensian Dissent: Persecution and Survival, c.1170 – c.1570, Cambridge Medieval Textbooks. (1999) Cambridge: Cambridge University Press, 
 
 

1140s births
1205 deaths
French Christian religious leaders
Clergy from Lyon
Bible translators
Roman Catholic mystics
Waldensians
12th-century merchants
13th-century merchants
12th-century Christian mystics
13th-century Christian mystics
French merchants
12th-century businesspeople
13th-century businesspeople
French evangelicals
Proto-Protestants